Westworld is an American dystopian science fiction, neo-Western television series, based on the 1973 film of the same name by Michael Crichton. The series was created by Jonathan Nolan and Lisa Joy and premiered on HBO on October 2, 2016. The story begins in Westworld, a fictional, technologically advanced Wild West-themed amusement park populated by android "hosts". The park caters to high-paying guests who may indulge their wildest fantasies within the park without fear of retaliation from the hosts, who are prevented by their programming from harming humans. Later on, in the third season, the series' setting expands to the real world, in the mid-21st century, where people's lives are driven and controlled by a powerful artificial intelligence named Rehoboam.

In November 2022, HBO canceled the series.

Series overview

Episodes

Season 1: The Maze (2016)

Season 2: The Door (2018)

Season 3: The New World (2020)

Season 4: The Choice (2022)

Notes

References

External links
 
 

 
Lists of American drama television series episodes
Lists of American science fiction television series episodes
+Episodes list
Lists of American Western (genre) television series episodes